David Wetherill (born 22 December 1989) is a British international table tennis player who has the rare bone development disorder Multiple Epiphyseal Dysplasia.

Wetherill's hometown is Torpoint, Cornwall Wetherill completed his bachelor's degree in Biological Chemistry at the University of Sheffield in 2011.

He has represented Great Britain at three international Paralympic Games, the first being Beijing in 2008 followed by London in 2012 and then 2016 Paralympic Games [Rio 2016]. He finished in the top 8 in the 2008 games. and was knocked out after his second game in 2012. Wetherill won a bronze medal in the singles and a silver medal in the team event at the 2015 European Championships. On 9 March 2016 Wetherill was officially selected as a member of the GB Paralympic Table Tennis Team for the 2016 Rio Paralympic Games.

Wetherill has also shown support for charities, and on 28 October spent the day participating in the 'Do it for you' day with cancer patients from the Sheffield Children's Hospital.

References

English male table tennis players
People from Torpoint
Living people
1989 births
Table tennis players at the 2020 Summer Paralympics